Night Sweats is a Canadian animated anthology series with live-action/CGI filler segments hosted by Bart Batchelor and Chris Nielsen. It was originally intended to premiere on Teletoon at Night, but due to a change of schedule, it premiered on Adult Swim on September 4, 2015, and was first aired on Teletoon at Night on February 29, 2016., The series aired on El Rey Network in the United States, Comedy Central in the United Kingdom, SBS in Australia. It shows short segments of several cartoons being created by Canadian animators from Bite on Mondo, a joint venture of Blue Ant Media's BiteTV (now Makeful) and Mondo Media.

The show consists of 26 episodes.

References

2010s Canadian adult animated television series
2010s Canadian anthology television series
2015 Canadian television series debuts
Teletoon original programming
Canadian television series with live action and animation
Canadian computer-animated television series
Canadian adult animated anthology television series
English-language television shows
Television series by Blue Ant Studios